Ramon Kaju (born 19 February 1973 in Viljandi) is a retired Estonian high jumper and decathlete.

He finished tenth at the 1998 European Indoor Championships. He also competed at the 1998 European Championships without reaching the final.

His personal best jump is 2.28 metres, achieved in August 1998 in Haapsalu. His personal best in decathlon was 7608 points achieved in 1997.

In 2000–2001 he played basketball in Estonian League team Nybit.

References

External links

1973 births
Living people
Estonian male high jumpers
Estonian decathletes
Estonian men's basketball players
Sportspeople from Viljandi